Molecular symmetry in physics and chemistry describes the symmetry present in molecules and the classification of molecules according to their symmetry. Molecular symmetry is a fundamental concept in the application of Quantum Mechanics in physics and chemistry, for example it can be used to predict or explain many of a molecule's properties, such as its dipole moment and its allowed spectroscopic transitions (based on selection rules), without doing the exact rigorous calculations (which, in some cases, may not even be possible). To do this it is necessary to classify the states of the molecule using the irreducible representations from the character table of the symmetry group of the molecule. Among all the molecular symmetries, diatomic molecules show some distinct features and they are relatively easier to analyze.

Symmetry and group theory 
The physical laws governing a system is generally written as a relation (equations, differential equations, integral equations etc.). An operation on the ingredients of this relation, which keeps the form of the relations invariant is called a symmetry transformation or a symmetry of the system.
 These symmetry operations can involve external or internal co-ordinates; giving rise to geometrical or internal symmetries. 
 These symmetry operations can be global or local; giving rise to global or gauge symmetries.
 These symmetry operations can be discrete or continuous.
Symmetry is a fundamentally important concept in quantum mechanics. It can predict conserved quantities and provide quantum numbers. It can predict degeneracies of eigenstates and gives insights about the matrix elements of the Hamiltonian without calculating them. Rather than looking into individual symmetries, it is sometimes more convenient to look into the general relations between the symmetries. It turns out that Group theory is the most efficient way of doing this.

Groups 

A group is a mathematical structure (usually denoted in the form (G,*)) consisting of a set G and a binary operation  (sometimes loosely called 'multiplication'), satisfying the following properties:
 closure: For every pair of elements , the product .
 associativity: For every x and y and z in G, both (x*y)*z and x*(y*z) result with the same element in G  (in symbols).
 existence of identity: There must be an element (say e ) in G such that product any element of G with e make no change to the element (in symbols,  ).
 existence of inverse: For each element ( x ) in G, there must be an element y in G such that product of x and y is the identity element e  (in symbols, for each  such that ).
 In addition to the above four, if it so happens that ,, i.e., the operation in commutative, then the group is called an Abelian Group. Otherwise it is called a Non-Abelian Group.

Groups, symmetry and conservation  
The set of all symmetry transformations of a Hamiltonian has the structure of a group, with group multiplication equivalent to applying the transformations one after the other. The group elements can be represented as matrices, so that the group operation becomes the ordinary matrix multiplication. In quantum mechanics, the evolution of an arbitrary superposition of states are given by unitary operators, so each of the elements of the symmetry groups are unitary operators. Now any unitary operator can be expressed as the exponential of some Hermitian operator. So, the corresponding Hermitian operators are the 'generators' of the symmetry group. These unitary transformations act on the Hamiltonian operator in some Hilbert space in a way that the Hamiltonian remains invariant under the transformations. In other words, the symmetry operators commute with the Hamiltonian. If  represents the unitary symmetry operator and acts on the Hamiltonian , then;

These operators have the above-mentioned properties of a group: 
 The symmetry operations are closed under multiplication. 
 Application of symmetry transformations are associative.
 There is always a trivial transformation, where nothing is done to the original co-ordinates. This is the identity element of the group. 
 And as long as an inverse transformation exists, it is a symmetry transformation, i.e. it leaves the Hamiltonian invariant. Thus the inverse is part of this set. 
So, by the symmetry of a system, we mean a set of operators, each of which commutes with the Hamiltonian, and they form a symmetry group. This group may be Abelian or Non-Abelian. Depending upon which one it is, the properties of the system changes (for example, if the group is Abelian, there would be no degeneracy). Corresponding to every different kind of symmetry in a system, we can find a symmetry group associated with it.

It follows that the generator  of the symmetry group also commutes with the Hamiltonian. Now, it follows that:

Some specific examples can be systems having rotational, translational invariance etc. For a rotationally invariant system, the symmetry group of the Hamiltonian is the general rotation group. Now, if (say) the system is invariant about any rotation about Z-axis (i.e., the system has axial symmetry), then the symmetry group of the Hamiltonian is the group of rotation about the symmetry axis. Now, this group is generated by the Z-component of the orbital angular momentum,  (general group element ). Similarly, translation symmetry gives rise to conservation of linear momentum, inversion symmetry gives rise to parity conservation and so on.

Geometrical symmetries

Symmetry operations, point groups and permutation-inversion groups 

A molecule at equilibrium in a certain electronic state usually has some geometrical symmetry. This symmetry is described by a certain point group which consists of operations (called symmetry operations) that produce a spatial orientation of the molecule that is indistinguishable from the starting configuration. There are five types of point group symmetry operation: identity, rotation, reflection, inversion and improper rotation or rotation-reflection. Common to all symmetry operations is that the geometrical center-point of the molecule does not change its position; hence the name point group. One  can determine the elements of the point group for a particular molecule by considering the geometrical symmetry of its molecular model. However, when one uses a point group, the elements are not to be interpreted in the same way. Instead the elements rotate and/or reflect the vibronic (vibration-electronic) coordinates and these elements commute with the vibronic Hamiltonian. The point group is used to classify by symmetry the vibronic eigenstates. The symmetry classification of the rotational levels, the eigenstates of the full (rovibronic nuclear spin) Hamiltonian, requires the use of the appropriate permutation-inversion group as introduced by Longuet-Higgins. See the Section Inversion symmetry and nuclear permutation symmetry below.  The elements of permutation-inversion groups commute with the full molecular Hamiltonian. In addition to point groups, there exists another kind of group important in crystallography, where translation in 3-D also needs to be taken care of. They are known as space groups.

Basic point group symmetry operations 
The five basic symmetry operations mentioned above are:
 Identity Operation E (from the German 'Einheit' meaning unity): The identity operation leaves the molecule unchanged. It forms the identity element in the symmetry group. Though its inclusion seems to be trivial, it is important also because even for the most asymmetric molecule, this symmetry is present. The corresponding symmetry element is the entire molecule itself. 
 Inversion, i : This operation inverts the molecule about its center of inversion (if it has any). The center of inversion is the symmetry element in this case. There may or may not be an atom at this center. A molecule may or may not have a center of inversion. For example: the benzene molecule, a cube, and spheres do have a center of inversion, whereas a tetrahedron does not.
 Reflection σ: The reflection operation produces a mirror image geometry of the molecule about a certain plane. The mirror plane bisects the molecule and must include its center of geometry. The plane of symmetry is the symmetry element in this case. A symmetry plane parallel with the principal axis (defined below)  is dubbed vertical (σv) and one perpendicular to it horizontal (σh). A third type of symmetry plane exists: If a vertical symmetry plane additionally bisects the angle between two 2-fold rotation axes perpendicular to the principal axis, the plane is dubbed dihedral (σd).
The axis of symmetry is the symmetry element in this case. A molecule can have more than one symmetry axis; the one with the highest n is called the principal axis, and by convention is assigned the z-axis in a Cartesian coordinate system.
 n-Fold Rotation-Reflection or improper rotation Sn : The n-fold improper rotation operation about an n-fold axis of improper rotation is composed of two successive geometry transformations: first, a rotation through  about the axis of that rotation, and second, reflection through a plane perpendicular (and through the molecular center of geometry) to that axis. This axis is the symmetry element in this case. It is abbreviated Sn.
All other symmetry present in a specific molecule are a combination of these 5 operations.

Schoenflies notation 

The Schoenflies (or Schönflies) notation, named after the German mathematician Arthur Moritz Schoenflies, is one of two conventions commonly used to describe point groups. This notation is used in spectroscopy and is used here to specify a molecular point group.

Point groups for diatomic molecules 

 :
The group , contains rotations  through any angle  about the axis of symmetry and an infinite number of reflections  through the planes containing the inter-nuclear axis (or the vertical axis, that is reason of the subscript 'v').In the group  all planes of symmetry are equivalent, so that all reflections  form a single class with a continuous series of elements; the axis of symmetry is bilateral, so that there is a continuous series of classes, each containing two elements . Note that this group is Non-abelian and there exists an infinite number of irreducible representations in the group. The character table of the group is as follows:

 :
In addition to axial reflection symmetry, homonuclear diatomic molecules are symmetric with respect to inversion or reflection through any axis in the plane passing through the point of symmetry and perpendicular to the inter-nuclear axis.  The classes of the group  can be obtained from those of the group  using the relation between the two groups: . Like ,  is  non-Abelian and there are an infinite number of irreducible representations in the group. The character table of this group is as follows:

Summary examples

Complete set of commuting operators 

So the quantum number  is no longer a good quantum number. The internuclear axis chooses a specific direction in space and the potential is no longer spherically symmetric. Instead,  and  commutes with the Hamiltonian  (taking the arbitrary internuclear axis as the Z axis). But  do not commute with  due to the fact that the electronic Hamiltonian of a diatomic molecule is invariant under rotations about the internuclear line (the Z axis), but not under rotations about the X or Y axes. The electronic Hamiltonian for a diatomic molecule is also invariant under reflections in all planes containing the internuclear line. The (X-Z) plane is such a plane, and reflection of the coordinates of the electrons in this plane corresponds to the operation . If  is the operator that performs this reflection, then .

In the special case of a homonuclear diatomic molecule, there is an extra symmetry since in addition to the axis of symmetry provided by the internuclear axis, there is a centre of symmetry at the midpoint of the distance between the two nuclei (the symmetry discussed in this paragraph only depends on the two nuclear charges being the same. Choosing this point as the origin of the coordinates, the Hamiltonian is invariant under an inversion of the coordinates of all electrons with respect to that origin, namely in the operation . Thus the parity operator .

Molecular term symbol, Λ-doubling 

Molecular term symbol is a shorthand expression of the group representation and angular momenta that characterize the state of a molecule. It is the equivalent of the term symbol for the atomic case. We already know the CSCO of the most general diatomic molecule. So, the good quantum numbers can sufficiently describe the state of the diatomic molecule. Here, the symmetry is explicitly stated in the nomenclature.

Angular momentum 

Here, the system is not spherically symmetric. If,

where  is the absolute value (in a.u.) of the projection of the total electronic angular momentum on the internuclear axis;  can be used as a term symbol. By analogy with the spectroscopic notation S, P, D, F, ... used for atoms, it is customary to associate code letters with the values of  according to the correspondence:

For the individual electrons, the notation and the correspondence used are:

 and

Axial symmetry 

Again, and in addition:  [as ]. It follows immediately that if  the action of the operator  on an eigenstate corresponding to the eigenvalue  of  converts this state into another one corresponding to the eigenvalue , and that both eigenstates have the same energy. The electronic terms such that  (that is, the terms ) are thus doubly degenerate, each value of the energy corresponding to two states which differ by the direction of the projection of the orbital angular momentum along the molecular axis. This twofold degeneracy is actually only approximate and it is possible to show that the interaction between the electronic and rotational motions leads to a splitting of the terms with  into two nearby levels, which is called -doubling.

 corresponds to the  states. These states are non-degenerate, so that the states of a  term can only be multiplied by a constant in a reflection through a plane containing the molecular axis. Since , the eigenfunctions of  have eigenvalues .

Inversion symmetry and nuclear permutation symmetry 

Homonuclear diatomic molecules have a center of symmetry at their midpoint. Choosing this point (which is the nuclear center of mass) as the origin of the coordinates, the electronic Hamiltonian is invariant under the point group operation i of inversion of the coordinates of all electrons at that origin. This operation is not the parity operation P (or E*); the parity operation involves the inversion of nuclear and electronic spatial coordinates at the molecular center of mass. Electronic states either remain unchanged by the operation i, or they are changed in sign by i. The former are denoted by the subscript g and are called gerade, while the latter are denoted by the subscript u and are called ungerade. The subscripts g or u are therefore added to the term symbol, so that for homonuclear diatomic molecules electronic states can have the symmetries ,......according to the irreducible representations of the   point group.

The complete Hamiltonian of a diatomic molecule (as for all molecules) commutes with the parity operation P or E* and rovibronic (rotation-vibration-electronic) energy levels (often called rotational levels) can be given the parity symmetry label + or -. The complete Hamiltonian of a homonuclear diatomic molecule also commutes with the operation
of permuting (or exchanging) the coordinates of the two (identical) nuclei and rotational levels 
gain the additional label s or a depending on whether the total wavefunction is
unchanged (symmetric) or changed in sign (antisymmetric) by the permutation operation. Thus, the rotational levels of heteronuclear diatomic molecules are labelled + or -, whereas those of homonuclear diatomic
molecules are labelled +s, +a, -s or -a. The rovibronic nuclear spin states are classified using the appropriate permutation-inversion group.

The complete Hamiltonian of a homonuclear diatomic molecule (as for all centro-symmetric molecules)
does not commute with the point group inversion operation i because of the effect of the nuclear hyperfine Hamiltonian. The nuclear hyperfine Hamiltonian can mix the rotational levels of g and u vibronic states (called ortho-para mixing) and give
rise to ortho-para transitions

Spin and total angular momentum 

If S denotes the resultant of the individual electron spins,  are the eigenvalues of S and as in the case of atoms, each electronic term of the molecule is also characterised by the value of S. If spin-orbit coupling is neglected, there is a degeneracy of order  associated with each  for a given . It is worth noting that the ground state (often labelled by the symbol ) of most diatomic molecules is such that  and exhibits maximum symmetry.

Spin–orbit coupling lifts the degeneracy of the electronic states. This is because the z-component of spin interacts with the z-component of the orbital angular momentum, generating a total electronic angular momentum along the molecule axis Jz. This is characterized by the quantum number , where . These pairs are grouped together with the quantum number , which is defined as the sum of the pair of values (ML, MS) for which ML is positive:

Molecular term symbol 

So, the overall molecular term symbol for the most general diatomic molecule is given by:

where
 S is the total spin quantum number
  is the projection of the orbital angular momentum along the internuclear axis
  is the projection of the total angular momentum along the internuclear axis
 u/g is the effect of the point group operation i
 +/− is the reflection symmetry along an arbitrary plane containing the internuclear axis

von Neumann-Wigner non-crossing rule

Effect of symmetry on the matrix elements of the Hamiltonian 
The electronic terms or potential curves  of a diatomic molecule depend only on the internuclear distance , and it is important to investigate the behaviour of these potential curves as R varies. It is of considerable interest to examine the intersection of the curves representing the different terms.

Let  and  two different electronic potential curves. If they intersect at some point, then the functions  and  will have neighbouring values near this point. To decide whether such an intersection can occur, it is convenient to put the problem as follows.

However, we have at our disposal only one arbitrary parameter  giving the perturbation . Hence the

two conditions involving more than one parameter cannot in general be simultaneously satisfied (the initial assumption that  and  real, implies that  is also real). So, two case can arise: 
 The matrix element  vanishes identically. It is then possible to satisfy the first condition independently.
 If  the electronic states  and  have the same point group symmetry, then  can be, and will in general be, non-zero.
Thus, in a diatomic molecule, only terms of different symmetry can intersect, while the intersection of terms of like symmetry is forbidden. This is, in general, true for any case in quantum mechanics where the Hamiltonian contains some parameter and its eigenvalues are consequently functions of that parameter. This general rule is known as von Neumann - Wigner non-crossing rule.

This general symmetry principle has important consequences is molecular spectra.
In fact, in the applications of valence bond method in case of diatomic molecules, three main correspondence between the atomic and the molecular orbitals are taken care of:
Thus, von Neumann-Wigner non-crossing rule also acts as a starting point for valence bond theory.

Observable consequences
Symmetry in diatomic molecules manifests itself directly by influencing the molecular spectra of the molecule. The effect of symmetry on different types of spectra in diatomic molecules are:

Rotational spectrum 
In the electric dipole approximation the transition amplitude for emission or absorption of radiation can be shown to be proportional to the vibronic matrix element of the component of the electric dipole operator  along the molecular axis. This is the permanent electric dipole moment.
In homonuclear diatomic molecules, the permanent electric dipole moment vanishes and there is no pure rotation spectrum (but see N.B. below).
Heteronuclear diatomic molecules possess a permanent electric dipole moment and exhibit spectra corresponding to rotational transitions, without change in the vibronic state. For , the selection rules for a rotational transition are: . Symmetry considerations require that the electric dipole moment of a diatomic molecule is directed along the internuclear line, and this leads to the additional selection rule .The pure rotational spectrum of a diatomic molecule consists of lines in the far infra-red or the microwave region, the frequencies of these lines given by:

; where , and 
 N.B. In exceptional circumstances the hyperfine Hamiltonian can mix the rotational levels of g and u vibronic states of homonuclear diatomic molecules giving rise to pure rotational (ortho - para) transitions in a homonuclear diatomic molecule.

Vibrational spectrum 
Because the dipole moment depends on the bond length , its variation with displacement of the nuclei from equilibrium can be expressed as: ; where  is the dipole moment when the displacement is zero. The transition matrix elements are, therefore: using orthogonality of the states. So, the transition matrix is non-zero only if the molecular dipole moment varies with displacement, for otherwise the derivatives of  would be zero. The gross selection rule for the vibrational transitions of diatomic molecules is then: To show a vibrational spectrum, a diatomic molecule must have a dipole moment that varies with extension. So, homonuclear diatomic molecules do not undergo electric-dipole vibrational transitions. So, a homonuclear diatomic molecule doesn't show purely vibrational spectra.

For small displacements, the electric dipole moment of a molecule can be expected to vary linearly with the extension of the bond. This would be the case for a heteronuclear molecule in which the partial charges on the two atoms were independent of the internuclear distance. Now, the matrix elements can be expressed in position basis in terms of the harmonic oscillator wavefunctions: Hermite polynomials. So, the selection rule for heteronuclear diatomic molecules is: 
 Conclusion: Homonuclear diatomic molecules show no pure vibrational spectral lines, and the vibrational spectral lines of heteronuclear diatomic molecules are governed by the above-mentioned selection rule.

Rovibrational spectrum 

Homonuclear diatomic molecules show neither pure vibrational nor pure rotational spectra. However, as the absorption of a photon requires the molecule to take up one unit of angular momentum, vibrational transitions are accompanied by a change in rotational state, which is subject to the same selection rules as for the pure rotational spectrum. The corresponding frequencies are given by: 

The corresponding frequencies are given by:  

Both branches make up what is called a rotational-vibrational band or a rovibrational band. These bands are in the infra-red part of the spectrum.

This gives rise to a further branch of the vibrational-rotational spectrum, called the Q branch.

For a heteronuclear diatomic molecule, this selection rule has two consequences:  
 Both the vibrational and rotational quantum numbers must change. The Q-branch is therefore forbidden.
 The energy change of rotation can be either subtracted from or added to the energy change of vibration, giving the P- and R- branches of the spectrum, respectively.
Homonuclear diatomic molecules also show this kind of spectra. The selection rules, however, are a bit different.
 Conclusion: Both homo- and hetero-nuclear diatomic molecules show rovibrational spectra. A Q-branch is absent in the spectra of heteronuclear diatomic molecules.

A special example: Hydrogen molecule ion  
An explicit implication of symmetry on the molecular structure can be shown in case of the simplest bi-nuclear system: a hydrogen molecule ion or a di-hydrogen cation, . Then there are clearly two possible states: the electron is attached either to one of the protons, forming a hydrogen atom in the ground state, or the electron is attached to the other proton, again in the ground state of a hydrogen atom (as depicted in the picture). 

The trial states in the position basis (or the 'wave functions') are then:

 and 

The analysis of  using variational method starts assuming these forms. Again, this is only one possible combination of states. There can be other combination of states also, for example, the electron is in an excited state of the hydrogen atom. The corresponding Hamiltonian of the system is:

Here, because of the relative simplicity of the  ion, the matrix elements can actually be calculated. The electronic Hamiltonian of  commutes with the  point group inversion symmetry operation i. Using its symmetry properties, we can relate the diagonal and off-diagonal elements of the Hamiltonian as:

From the graph, we see that only  has a minimum corresponding to a separation of 1.3 Å and a total energy , which is less than the initial energy of the system, .

See also 
 Character table

 Diatomic molecule
 Molecular symmetry
 Schoenflies notation
 List of character tables for chemically important 3D point groups
 Hund's cases
 Rotational-vibrational spectroscopy
 Molecular term symbol
 Avoided crossing
 Dihydrogen cation
 Symmetry in quantum mechanics
 Group (mathematics)
 Point groups in three dimensions
 Complete set of commuting observables
 Born-Oppenheimer approximation

Notes

References

Further reading
 Quantum Mechanics, Third Edition: Non-Relativistic Theory (Volume 3)by L. D. Landau, L. M. Lifshitz;  Edition: 3rd; chapters: XI and XII. 
 Physics of Atoms & Molecules by B.H. Bransden, C.J. Joachain;  Edition: 2nd edition; chapter: 9 
 Molecular Spectra and Molecular Structure: Spectra of Diatomic Molecules by Gerhard Herzberg;  Edition: 2nd 
 Molecular Quantum Mechanics by Peter W. Atkins, Ronald S. Friedman;  Edition: 5th; chapter: 10. 
 Lecture notes on Quantum Mechanics (handouts: 12, 10) by Prof. Sourendu Gupta, Tata Institute of Fundamental Research, Mumbai. 
 Symmetry in Physics: Principles and Simple Applications Volume 1 by James Philip Elliott, P.G. Dawber;  
 A Modern Approach to Quantum Mechanics by John S. Townsend;  Edition 2nd;  
 http://www.astro.uwo.ca/~jlandstr/p467/lec5-mol_spect/index.html

External links 
 http://www.astro.uwo.ca/~jlandstr/p467/lec5-mol_spect/index.html
 http://csi.chemie.tu-darmstadt.de/ak/immel/script/redirect.cgi?filename=http://csi.chemie.tu-darmstadt.de/ak/immel/tutorials/symmetry/index1.html
 http://theory.tifr.res.in/~sgupta/courses/qm2014/index.php
 A pdf file explaining the relation between Point Groups and Permutation-Inversion Groups Link

Symmetry
Theoretical chemistry
Molecular physics